The Mölln arson attack was the first fatal case of far-right extremists setting fire to migrants' homes in Germany, and one of the earliest cases of Right-wing terrorism in the country's post-unification history. On the night of 22 November 1992, 2 German men with neo-Nazi ties set fire to the 2 houses of Turkish families in Mölln, in Schleswig-Holstein, Germany. 3 Turks died in the attack while 9 others were injured.

Background 

The fall of the Berlin wall in 1989, and the reunification of Germany, saw a sharp rise in violent attacks against Turkish-Germans. A series of arson attacks, bombings, and shootings have targeted the Turkish community in both public and private spaces, such as in their homes, cultural centres, and businesses. Consequently, many victims have been killed or severely injured by these attacks.

Attack 
On the night of 22 November 1992,  Mölln, Schleswig-Holstein two right-wing extremists, Michael Peters and 19-year-old Lars Christiansen firebombed two houses inhabited by the Turkish Arslan and Yılmaz families. 

Local neighbours witnessed people jumping out of windows as their homes were set ablaze. The Yılmaz family was the first to be evacuated, but the Arslans' staircase and halls were blocked by the fire. 7-year old Ibrahim Arslan was wrapped in damp towels by his grandfather as he was rushed to the outside.

The town's fire department received an anonymous call shortly after midnight reporting that an apartment building in the city’s center, where several foreign families lived, was on fire. The caller ended his call with the words “Heil Hitler.” While the response by police and firemen were as fast as possible, the damage had been done by the time they arrived.

Two girls, 14-year-old Ayşe Yılmaz and 10-year-old Yeliz Arslan and their 51-year-old grandmother Bahide Arslan died in the flames. Nine others, including a 9-month-old baby were seriously injured.

Aftermath 
To protest the attack, several thousand people marched quietly in Berlin and Hamburg. Mölln's mayor, Joachim Doerfler, headed a silent procession of several hundred residents.

Lars and Michael were found guilty by German courts, and the latter sentenced to life imprisonment. This was around the same times far-right terrorists massacred 5 members of a Turkish family in Solingen.

The murders scared the German public, especially the Turkish minority, of the possibility of future attacks.

Notes

References

External links 

 Discrimination against Turks in Germany lingers 25 years after Solingen tragedy | Daily Sabah

1990s in North Rhine-Westphalia
1992 crimes in Germany
1992 fires in Europe
Anti-Muslim violence in Europe
Arson in Germany
Attacks on buildings and structures in Germany
Crime in North Rhine-Westphalia
Firebombings
German people of Turkish descent
Hate crimes
Mass murder in 1992
Neo-Nazi attacks in Germany
November 1992 events in Europe
Persecution of Turks in Germany
Terrorist incidents in Europe in 1992